Archbishop Walsh Academy is a private, Roman Catholic high school in Olean, New York. It is a college preparatory, co-ed, day school, serving students from both New York Pennsylvania. Southern Tier Catholic School is the Montessori preschool, elementary, middle school, and high school located on the same campus.

Background
Archbishop Walsh was established in 1958 and is the only Catholic high school in Western New York south of Cattaraugus Creek. Constructed at the height of the Cold War, the building's foundation included a fall out shelter for students and faculty in the event nuclear war found its way to the Enchanted Mountains. Today the shelter is used primarily for storage. Students began a tradition of signing their names in paint on the shelter's walls to memorialize their experience at the school.

References

Catholic secondary schools in New York (state)
Educational institutions established in 1958
Roman Catholic Diocese of Buffalo
Schools in Cattaraugus County, New York
1958 establishments in New York (state)